The 2014 Sun Belt Conference men's soccer tournament was the 12th overall tournament and the first Sun Belt Conference tournament since 1995.

Held from November 14–16 at Eagle Field in Statesboro, Georgia, it determined the Sun Belt Conference champion, and the automatic berth into the 2014 NCAA Division I Men's Soccer Championship. The Hartwick Hawks won the title, defeating hosts, Georgia Southern Eagles in  the final, 1–0.

Bracket

Schedule

First round

Semifinals

Sun Belt Championship

Statistical leaders 

To be determined once the tournament begins.

See also 
 Sunt Belt Conference
 2014 Sun Belt Conference men's soccer season
 2014 NCAA Division I men's soccer season
 2014 NCAA Division I Men's Soccer Championship

References 

Sun Belt Conference Men's Soccer Tournament
Sun Belt Conference Men's Soccer
Sun Belt Conference Men's Soccer Tournament
Soccer in Georgia (U.S. state)